The 2017 CME Group Tour Championship was the seventh CME Group Tour Championship, a women's professional golf tournament and the season-ending event on the U.S.-based LPGA Tour. It was played at the Gold Course of Tiburón Golf Club in Naples, Florida.

The CME Group Tour Championship also marked the end of the season-long "Race to the CME Globe" in 2017. Each player's season-long "Race to the CME Globe" points were "reset" before the tournament based on their position in the points list. "Championship points" were awarded to the top 40 players in the CME Group Tour Championship which were added to their "reset points" to determine the overall winner of the "Race to the CME Globe". The event was televised by Golf Channel Thursday through Saturday on a 2-hour delay, and ABC Sunday live.

Format

Qualification
Called the "CME Group Titleholders" for its first three editions, qualification for the tournament changed for 2014. Previously, the top three finishers in each tournament, not previously qualified, earned entry to the tournament. For 2014 the field was determined by a season-long points race, the "Race to the CME Globe". All players making the cut in a tournament earned points, with 500 points going to the winner. The five major championships had a higher points distribution, with 625 points to the winner. No-cut tournaments only awarded points to the top 40 finishers (top 20 for the Lorena Ochoa Match Play).

Only LPGA members were eligible to earn points. The top 82 players on the "Race to the CME Globe" points list gained entry into the CME Group Titleholders Championship as well as any tournament winners, whether or not an LPGA member, not in the top 82.

Field
1. Top 82 LPGA members and those tied for 82nd on the "Race to the CME Globe" Points Standings

Marina Alex, Brittany Altomare, Aditi Ashok, Nicole Broch Larsen, Pei-Yun Chien, Chun In-gee, Carlota Ciganda, Cydney Clanton, Jacqui Concolino, Lindy Duncan, Austin Ernst, Jodi Ewart Shadoff, Shanshan Feng, Sandra Gal, Jaye Marie Green, Brooke Henderson, Wei-Ling Hsu, Charley Hull, Karine Icher, Jang Ha-na, Ji Eun-hee, Tiffany Joh, Ariya Jutanugarn, Moriya Jutanugarn, Danielle Kang, Kim Kaufman, Cristie Kerr, Megan Khang, In-Kyung Kim, Kim Sei-young, Katherine Kirk, Lydia Ko, Jessica Korda, Nelly Korda, Olafia Kristinsdottir, Candie Kung, Brittany Lang, Lee Jeong-eun, Lee Mi-hyang, Minjee Lee, Mirim Lee, Stacy Lewis, Brittany Lincicome, Pernilla Lindberg, Gaby López, Mo Martin, Caroline Masson, Ally McDonald, Azahara Muñoz, Anna Nordqvist, Ryann O'Toole, Jane Park, Park Sung-hyun, Suzann Pettersen, Pornanong Phatlum, Gerina Piller, Morgan Pressel, Beatriz Recari, Ryu So-yeon, Madelene Sagström, Lizette Salas, Alena Sharp, Jenny Shin, Sarah Jane Smith, Jennifer Song, Angela Stanford, Lexi Thompson, Ayako Uehara, Michelle Wie, Jing Yan, Amy Yang, Angel Yin, Yoo Sun-young

Qualified but did not play: Ashleigh Buhai, Chella Choi, Laura Gonzalez Escallon, M. J. Hur, Kim Hyo-joo, Haru Nomura, Su-Hyun Oh, Inbee Park, Karrie Webb

2. LPGA Members, not otherwise qualified, who won at least one official LPGA tournament during the season

None

3. Non-members who won at least one official LPGA tournament during the season

Ko Jin-young

Nationalities in the field

Race to the CME Globe

Reset points
Each player's "Race to the CME Globe" points were "reset" before the tournament based on their position in the "Race to the CME Globe" points list. The leader was given 5,000 points, the player in second place 4,500 down to 10 points for the player in 72nd place.

Final points
"Championship points" were awarded to the top 40 players in the CME Group Tour Championship which were added to their "reset points" to determine the overall winner. The winner of the CME Group Tour Championship receiver 3,500 points, the second place player 2,450, down to 150 points for the player finishing in 40th place. The effect of the points system is that the top five players in the reset points list prior to the Championship would be guaranteed to win the "Race to the CME Globe" by winning the Championship. The top 12 in the reset points list would have a chance of winning the Race depending on the performances of other players.

Bonus
The winner of the "Race to the CME Globe", Lexi Thompson, received a $1 million bonus that does not count toward official money list, while Park Sung-hyun in second place and Ariya Jutanugarn in third place received $150,000 and $100,000, respectively.

Final leaderboard
Sunday, November 19, 2017

References

External links

Coverage on LPGA Tour's official site
Tiburón Golf Club − official site

2017 CME Group Tour Championship
2017 CME Group Tour Championship
2017 in women's golf
2017 in American women's sports
2017 in sports in Florida
November 2017 sports events in the United States